Redding is the economic and cultural capital of the Shasta Cascade region of Northern California and the county seat of Shasta County. Its population is 95,542 as of the 2022 census, up from 89,861 from the 2010 census.

Etymology 
During the Gold Rush, the area that now comprises Redding was called Poverty Flats. In 1868 the first land agent for the Central Pacific Railroad, a former Sacramento politician named Benjamin Bernard Redding, bought property in Poverty Flats on behalf of the railroad so that it could build a northern terminus there. In the process of building the terminus, the railroad also built a town in the same area, which they named Redding in honor of Benjamin Redding.

In 1874 there was a dispute over the name by local legislators and it was changed for a time to Reading, in order to honor Pierson B. Reading, who arrived in the area in 1843, owned the Buenaventura land grant on which Redding sits, and had died only a few years before, in 1868.  The name was officially changed back to Redding by 1880.

History

Indigenous culture 
Before European settlers came to the area, it was inhabited by a tribe of Native Americans called the Wintu. At their height, the Wintu had as many as 239 villages in the Shasta County area.

Spanish and Mexican eras 

Although Europeans had been to California as early as 1542, when Juan Cabrillo sailed to what is now the San Diego Bay, the indigenous natives were probably the only inhabitants of far Northern California region until Russian fur trappers came through the area in 1815.

The first European settlement in the area was established in 1844 by Pierson B. Reading, an early California pioneer who received a Rancho Buena Ventura Mexican land grant for  that is now covered by Redding and Cottonwood, California. At the time, it was the northernmost nonnative settlement in California.

Gold Rush era 
During the Gold Rush, 49ers found gold to the north on Rock, Middle and Salt creeks, near Shasta, California, and to the south along Oregon and Olney creeks but the area that is now Redding was poor placer gold ground and called Poverty Flats. In 1868 the first land agent for the Central Pacific Railroad, a former Sacramento politician named Benjamin B. Redding, bought property in Poverty Flats on behalf of the railroad for a northern terminus, which the tracks reached in 1872. In the process of building the terminus, the railroad also built the town of Redding which was officially incorporated on October 4, 1887. In 1888, Redding won the county seat from Shasta.

20th century 

In the early twentieth century the town's economic growth was spurred by the significant copper and iron mineral extraction industry nearby. The mining industry eventually declined, causing the economy and population to falter by 1920. It recovered in the thirties as the economy boomed due to the construction of Shasta Dam to the northwest. The building of the dam, which was completed in 1945, caused Redding's population to nearly double, also spurring the growth and development of other towns in the area.

Redding continued to grow steadily in the 1950s due to the region's growing lumber industry and tourism brought about by the newly completed dam. The constructions of Whiskeytown and Keswick dams also helped boost the economy by bringing new workers to the area. Interstate 5 was built during the sixties and seventies, which added to development and tourism in the region.

Growth in Redding during the 1960s and 1970s was further spurred by the annexation of an area east of the Sacramento River that included the unincorporated community of Enterprise; the residents voted to support the annexation primarily to acquire less expensive electricity via Redding's municipal utility, which receives power from the dam.

During the 1970s, the lumber industry suffered from decline. In the early 1990's Lumber mills in the area closed down due to the preservation of the living habitat of the Spotted Owl.  This heavily impacted the Redding area. The economy picked up, due to a retail and housing boom in the late 1980s that continued until the mid-1990s.

21st century 
In 2017, the city adopted a new flag after holding a redesign contest.

The 21st century has also seen a number of devastating wildfires near and in Redding. In 1999, the Jones Fire destroyed over 100 structures, followed by the Bear Fire in 2004. In late July 2018, the Carr Fire in Shasta County seriously impacted the Redding area with the destruction of at least 1,100 buildings, with several thousand more threatened, 38,000 people instructed to evacuate and 6 deaths. Most recently, the Fawn Fire in 2021 also resulted in the evacuation of over 4,000 people and the destruction of 185 buildings.

Geography 

Redding is located at the very northwestern end of the Central Valley, which transitions into the Cascade foothills. The city is surrounded by mountains to the north, east, and west and fertile farm land to the south. Outermost parts of the city are part of the Cascade foothills, whereas southern and central areas are in the Sacramento Valley.

The Shasta Dam on the Sacramento River provides a considerable level of flood protection for Redding. The dam is capable of controlling flows up to 79,000 cubic feet (7,300 cubic meters) per second. The flow rate exceeded this threshold in both 1970 and 1974.

Soils in and around town are composed mostly of clay or gravelly loam texture, with red or brown mineral horizons. They are slightly or moderately acidic in their natural state.

There are several rare and endangered species in Redding and its immediate vicinity. The Redding Redevelopment Plan EIR notes the California State listed endangered species, slender Orcutt grass (Orcuttia tenuis), occurs in eastern Redding near the municipal airport, where vernal pools are known to exist. This endemic grass is a Federal Candidate for listing and is endangered throughout its range, confined to several populations, and seriously threatened by agriculture, overgrazing, and residential development. Vernal pools provide the preferred habitat for this plant, which the California Native Plant Society considers a rare and endangered species. These same vernal pools also support federally protected species such as the federally threatened vernal pool fairy shrimp (Branchinecta lynchi).

Climate 

Redding has a hot-summer Mediterranean climate (Köppen: Csa), with very hot, dry summers and cool, wet winters. Redding is known for very high summer temperatures, despite being located just north of the 40th Parallel North. Winter (October–April) provides the most precipitation of any season in Redding—the weather tends to be either rainy or foggy and at times, snow occurs. While summers are mostly hot and dry, thunderstorms are not uncommon. The average daily maximum temperature in July stays near . Redding has an average possible sunshine of 88%, the second-highest percentage (after Yuma, Arizona) of any US city.

Summer overnight lows are unusually warm by Sacramento Valley standards and average warmer than coastal towns' daytime highs. The warmest night annually averages . Redding's warm summer days and nights compared to areas further south are a result of a greater distance to maritime influences than the lower end of the valley.

It rarely gets sleet or freezing rain. Frost occurs commonly in December through February, less often in March or November. In spring, rain is common. The city is located near the foothills of the Cascade and Klamath mountain ranges and it therefore gets much more rain than most places in the Sacramento Valley; temperature differentials between land and sea cause moist air from the latter to flow over the southern Sacramento valley during the summer months, producing intense heat in Redding. The direction of this winds switches from the north and east in the summer, as hot, high-pressure air flows from land to sea, making the area very dry. Tornadoes are extremely rare; flooding occurs only around the area near the Sacramento River.

Demographics 

The 2010 United States Census reported that Redding had a population of 89,861. The racial makeup of Redding was 77,117 (85.8%) White, 1,092 (1.2%) African American, 2,034 (2.3%) Native American, 3,034 (3.4%) Asian, 156 (0.2%) Pacific Islander, 2,307 (2.6%) from other races, and 4,121 (4.6%) from two or more races. There were 7,787 people of Hispanic or Latino origin, of any race (8.7%).

The Census reported that 87,841 people (97.8% of the population) lived in households, 1,138 (1.3%) lived in non-institutionalized group quarters, and 882 (1.0%) were institutionalized.

There were 36,130 households, out of which 11,012 (30.5%) had children under the age of 18 living in them, 16,001 (44.3%) were married couples living together, 4,806 (13.3%) had a female householder with no husband present, 1,984 (5.5%) had a male householder with no wife present.  There were 2,570 (7.1%) unmarried opposite-sex partnerships, and 204 (0.6%) same-sex married couples or partnerships. 10,344 households (28.6%) were made up of individuals, and 4,622 (12.8%) had someone living alone who was 65 years of age or older. The average household size was 2.43.  There were 22,791 families (63.1% of all households); the average family size was 2.94.

The population was spread out, with 20,518 people (22.8%) under the age of 18, 9,436 people (10.5%) aged 18 to 24, 21,725 people (24.2%) aged 25 to 44, 23,424 people (26.1%) aged 45 to 64, and 14,758 people (16.4%) who were 65 years of age or older.  The median age was 38.5 years. For every 100 females, there were 93.8 males.  For every 100 females age 18 and over, there were 90.4 males.

The homeowner vacancy rate was 2.3%; the rental vacancy rate was 6.9%.  48,179 people (53.6% of the population) lived in owner-occupied housing units and 39,662 people (44.1%) lived in rental housing units.

Economy 

Redding is the economic hub of the Shasta Cascade region of Northern California.

The Redding Metropolitan Statistical Area (MSA) was recognized as the 29th Most Dynamic MSA in the United States in 2019 by the Walton Family Foundation. Redding was recognized for having a diversified economy with several large employers in different sectors.

Top employers 
According to the city's 2016 Comprehensive Annual Financial Report, the top employers in Redding are:

Government

State and federal representation 

Municipal government 

The city council is composed of Mayor Erin Resner, Vice Mayor Kristen Schreder, Julie Winter, Michael Dacquisto, and Mark Mezzano.  The city manager is Barry Tippin.

Redding is a general law city operating under the council-manager form of government.

Parks and recreation

Museums and public art 
 Sculpture park at City Hall
 Sundial Bridge at Turtle Bay, by Santiago Calatrava
 Santiago Calatrava sculpture, at Domke Plaza
 Shasta Historical Society

Architecture 
 Hotel Lorenz
 Pilgrim Congregational Church

Venues 
 Cascade Theatre
 The Dip
 Riverfront Amphitheater
 Old City Hall
 Redding Civic Auditorium

Performing arts 
 Riverfront Playhouse
 Axiom Repertory Theater

Education

Higher education

Public 
 Shasta College

Private 
 National University
 Shasta Bible College and Graduate School
 Simpson University

High schools

Public 
 Shasta High School
 Enterprise High School
 Foothill High School
 Pioneer High School

Secondary 
 Freedom High School
 University Preparatory School
 North State Independence High School
 Redding Christian High School
 Liberty Christian High School

Charter schools 
 Chrysalis Charter School
 Monarch Learning Center
 Stellar Charter School
 Phoenix Charter Academy
 Redding Collegiate Academy
 Redding School of the Arts
 Rocky Point Charter School
 Shasta Charter Academy

Trade schools 
 Redding Institute of Technology
 Shasta School of Cosmetology
 CloudWise Academy

Media

Print 
 Redding Record Searchlight
 After Five

Television 
 KRCR News Channel 7. The Northstate’s News

Radio

Transportation

Major highways 
  Interstate 5 runs through the east central portion of Redding.
  CA 299, formerly  U.S. 299, runs through the western, central, and northeastern parts of the city.
  CA 44 runs through the middle and eastern part of town. Its western terminus is at Market Street (California 273) in downtown Redding.
  CA 273, formerly the Interstate 5 Business Route and also formerly  U.S. 99, runs through the city.

Rail and bus transportation 
Amtrak, the national passenger rail system, provides service to Redding station, operating its Coast Starlight daily in both directions between Seattle, Washington, and Los Angeles, California VA Portland, Oregon; Sacramento, California; Oakland, California; San Jose, California; Santa Barbara, California and all Intermediate station stops.
Amtrak California also provides Thruway Motorcoach service to Stockton or Sacramento for connections to the San Joaquins, which serve the San Francisco Bay Area, San Joaquin Valley and the Los Angeles area via bus connections.

Redding provides a city bus transportation system called RABA (Redding Area Bus Authority). RABA provides routes throughout the City of Redding and also provides transportation throughout Redding's suburbs. Transportation is also available by RABA to Burney, by Sage Stage to Alturas and by Trinity Transit to Weaverville. Redding is also served by the intercity bus companies Greyhound and Fronteras del Norte.

Shasta Regional Transportation Agency is developing a weekday commuter bus from Redding to the Sacramento Valley Station.

Air transportation 
Air transportation for the Redding area is provided by two general aviation airports. Redding Regional Airport, located south of Redding, has scheduled flights from SkyWest (United Express) and Avelo Airlines. The smaller Benton Airpark is located on the western side of Redding.

Notable people 

This list includes notable persons who were born/raised/worked in, lived in, or whose identity was significantly influenced by Redding, as well as music groups that were founded in the area.

 Ashley Parker Angelrecording artist and actor
 David de Berrytheater composer and actor
 Shane Drakemusic video director
 Francesca Eastwoodactor
 Rich Eisensportscaster
 Kathleen Kennedyfilm producer
 Matthew Kennedyauthor
 Tom Meyerprofessor, speaker, and author
 Kevin RoseInternet entrepreneur
Cory Asburycontemporary Christian singer
Duffy Bishopelectric blues singer and songwriter
Brian Johnson - contemporary worship singer and songwriter
 Randy Millerdrummer of The Myriad
 Craig Padillaambient electronic musician and film score composer
 Jessica Prattsinger/ songwriter
 Roy Rogersguitarist
 Rick Bosettiprofessional baseball player
 Greg CadaretMLB player
 Mel Heinfootball player, 1938 MVP, NFL Hall of Fame inductee
 Paul Howardformer NFL player
 Eddie Machenheavyweight boxer
 Buck Martinezprofessional MLB player, manager, broadcaster
 Matt NicholsCanadian Football League player
 Ryan O'CallaghanNFL football player
 Hilary Pecis (born 1979)artist
 Bill PlummerMLB player, coach and manager
 Megan Rapinoeprofessional soccer player, Olympic gold medalist
 Ricky Rayfootball player in the Canadian Football League
 Lynne Robertscollege basketball coach
 Jason Sehornformer NFL player
 John Strohmayerformer MLB player and high school coach
 Raymond JacobsUS Marine, said to be in photo of first flag raised on Iwo Jima
 Brian Sandoval29th governor of Nevada
 Sam Butcherartist, Precious Moments, Inc.
 Jeffery Danglplant immunologist
 Bill JohnsonChristian minister and evangelist
 Ruggles brothersstagecoach robbers
 Michael Zagarissports and music photographer

Notes

References

External links 

 Official website
 

 
1887 establishments in California
Cities in Shasta County, California
County seats in California
Geography of the Sacramento Valley
Incorporated cities and towns in California
Logging communities in the United States
Populated places established in 1887
Populated places on the Sacramento River
Shasta Cascade